Sunwoo Sun (born Jung Yoo-jin on March 21, 1975) is a South Korean actress. She made her acting debut in 2003, but rose to stardom in 2009 with the television drama Queen of Housewives. Other notable films and series include My New Partner (2008), Running Turtle (2009), and Will It Snow for Christmas? (2009).

Filmography

Film

Television series

Variety show

Music video

Discography

Awards and nominations

References

External links

 Sunwoo Sun at SidusHQ 
 
 
 

1975 births
IHQ (company) artists
Living people
People from Incheon
South Korean television actresses
South Korean film actresses
Incheon National University alumni